An Inconvenient Truth is a 2006 documentary starring Al Gore.

An Inconvenient Truth may also refer to:
An Inconvenient Truth (book), a book by Al Gore
An InCONvenient Truth, an album by Madcon